Mexico sent a delegation to compete at the 2008 Summer Paralympics in Beijing. The country was represented by 68 athletes, a smaller delegation than at the previous Games.

Medallists

Sports

Athletics

Men's track

Men's field

Women's track

Women's field

Cycling

Men's road

Judo

Men

Women

Swimming

Women

Powerlifting

Men

Women

Table tennis

Wheelchair basketball

The women's basketball team didn't win any medals; they were 9th out of 10 teams.

Players
Floralia Estrada Bernal
Rosa Camara Arango
Wendy Garcia Amador
Rubicela Guzman Acosta
Claudia Magali Miranda
Anaisa Perez Pacheco
Patricia Rodriguez Velazquez
Rocio Torres Lopez
Alma Torres Rodriguez
Lucia Vazquez Delgadillo
Cecilia Vazquez Suarez
Rosa Herlinda Vera
Coach
Aarón Dávila García

Tournament

  

9th-10th classification

See also
Mexico at the Paralympics
Mexico at the 2008 Summer Olympics

External links
Beijing 2008 Paralympic Games Official Site
International Paralympic Committee

References

Nations at the 2008 Summer Paralympics
2008
Paralympics